is a Japanese editor. After studying in MIT Media Lab, he worked as editor for computer magazines ASAHI pasokon and Doors.

References

1951 births
Living people
Japanese editors
Place of birth missing (living people)
Date of birth missing (living people)
MIT Media Lab people